Andy Greenwald (born May 19, 1977) is an American author, critic, podcaster, screenwriter, and television producer.

Life and career 

Greenwald grew up in Philadelphia and currently lives in Los Angeles, California. He graduated from Friends' Central School in Philadelphia and Brown University in Providence. He is married to an attorney and has two daughters.

Greenwald was a senior contributing writer at Spin, and has also written for such publications as The Washington Post, Blender, Entertainment Weekly, The Village Voice, MTV Magazine, Complex, and Magnet. He is the author of the books Nothing Feels Good: Punk Rock, Teenagers, and Emo and Miss Misery: A Novel.

From 2011 to 2015, he was a staff writer and principal TV writer for Bill Simmons' ESPN website Grantland. During his time at Grantland, he began podcasting with his best friend and pop culture writer Chris Ryan., hosting both the Andy Greenwald Podcast and the Hollywood Prospectus Podcast. Once Grantland closed and Simmons started The Ringer in Los Angeles, both Greenwald and Ryan began co-hosting The Watch on the new site's podcast network. In 2016, he and Ryan began hosting the Game of Thrones aftershow After the Thrones on HBO, as well as the Mr Robot aftershow Hacking Robot on USA Network.

Beginning in 2016, Greenwald worked as a screenwriter on the superhero TV show Legion. In 2018, Greenwald and Sam Esmail's adaptation of the Ross Thomas book Briarpatch was ordered to series on USA Network. Greenwald is both a writer and executive producer on the show, which stars Rosario Dawson. The show was cancelled after one season.

References

External links 

Andy Greenwald website
Greenwald on Twitter
Greenwald on Instagram
The Watch Podcast on iTunes

Living people
American male journalists
Brown University alumni
1977 births
American podcasters
American male screenwriters
American television producers
American television writers
American male television writers
Friends' Central School alumni